The Daniel Sweetser House is a historic house at 458 Lowell Street in Wakefield, Massachusetts.  The -story timber-frame house was built sometime before 1795, probably for Daniel Sweetser, who then occupied the property.  It is a conservative Federal style house with two interior chimneys, and is one of the town's better preserved rural properties of the period.  Its most notable resident was James Mansfield, the town's first postal letter carrier.

The house was listed on the National Register of Historic Places in 1989.

See also
National Register of Historic Places listings in Wakefield, Massachusetts
National Register of Historic Places listings in Middlesex County, Massachusetts

References

Houses on the National Register of Historic Places in Wakefield, Massachusetts
Federal architecture in Massachusetts
Houses completed in 1780
Houses in Wakefield, Massachusetts